Artur Kamilevich Akhmatkhuzin (born 21 May 1988) is a Russian foil fencer, silver medallist at the 2013 World Fencing Championships.

Career
Akhmatkhuzin, who is of Tatar descent, made his debut in international competition at the 2005 Cadet World Championships in Linz, where he earned a bronze medal. That same year, he joined the cadet and junior national team, in which he won a team gold medal in the 2005 Junior European Championships at Tapolca, a team silver medal in the 2007 Junior European Championship in Prague, and a team bronze medal in the 2007 World European Championships in Belek.

In the seniors, Akhmatkhuzin placed second in the 2012 Venice Grand Prix, his first podium in the Fencing World Cup. He took part in the 2012 Summer Olympics, but was defeated in the last 16 by China's Ma Jianfei. In 2013 he won the A Coruña World Cup and earned a bronze medal in the Prince Takamado World Cup. Ranked 6th before the 2013 World Fencing Championships in Budapest, he defeated Olympic silver medallist Alaaeldin Abouelkassem in the last 16, then Olympic champion Lei Sheng and Ukraine's Rostyslav Hertsyk to reach the final against Miles Chamley-Watson of the United States. Distanced early in the bout, he was defeated 6–15 and ended up with a silver medal. He finished the season No.3 in world rankings. A few weeks later, Akhmatkhuzin took part in the 2013 World Combat Games. He was defeated by Great Britain's Richard Kruse in the semi-finals and met Chamley-Watson for the third place. This time he defeated the American 15–12 to take the bronze medal.

In the 2013–14 season, Akhmatkhuzin reached the quarter-finals in the Paris World Cup. He was defeated by Enzo Lefort, who eventually won the gold medal. An injury sustained during the competition prevented him from taking part to the team event. He later underwent surgery and was rested for the entire season.

Akhmatkhuzin came back to international competition in early 2015 at the Paris World Cup. He made it through the qualification stage, but was defeated in the first elimination round by Italy's Daniele Garozzo, who eventually won the silver medal. At the next World Cup competition, the Löwe von Bonn, he was stopped in the last 16 by Japan's Yuki Ota.

At the 2016 Summer Olympics, in the men's individual foil, he beat Miles Chamley-Watson in the last 32, before losing to eventual silver medalist American Alexander Massialas in the last 16.  In the team event, Russia won the gold medal, with Akhmatkhuzin anchoring the Russian performance and scoring the winning hit.

Akhmatkhuzin studies at the Bashkir Academy of Public service and administration under the President of the Republic of Bashkortostan.

References

External links

 
  (archive)
  (archive)
 
 
 

1988 births
Living people
Russian male foil fencers
Olympic fencers of Russia
Fencers at the 2012 Summer Olympics
Fencers at the 2016 Summer Olympics
Sportspeople from Bashkortostan
Olympic medalists in fencing
Olympic gold medalists for Russia
Medalists at the 2016 Summer Olympics
Universiade medalists in fencing
Universiade gold medalists for Russia
Russian State University of Physical Education, Sport, Youth and Tourism alumni
Medalists at the 2009 Summer Universiade
Medalists at the 2011 Summer Universiade
Medalists at the 2013 Summer Universiade
Tatar people of Russia
Volga Tatars
Tatar sportspeople
21st-century Russian people